Lisankhu is a village and former village development committee in Sindhupalchok District in Bagmati Province of central Nepal. At the time of the 1991 Nepal census it had a population of 4548 and had 890 houses in the village.

References

Populated places in Sindhupalchowk District